Anri Okita (Japanese: 沖田杏梨) is an English-born Japanese actress, singer, songwriter, and former pornographic actress.

Between 2011 and 2016 Okita was active as a popular AV idol before retiring in May 2016 to focus on a career in mainstream media. From 2016 to 2017, Okita was a member of the idol group Ebisu Muscats. In 2017, Okita debuted as a solo music artist and released the album GORILLA. Okita has also acted in numerous mainstream Japanese language films, such as Naked Ambition 2 (2014), Assassination Classroom (2015), Scoop! (2016), and Diamond Dogs (2017).

Early years 
Okita was born in Birmingham, England, United Kingdom. At the age of eight, Okita and her family moved back to Japan. Okita first began watching adult videos (AV) during her teenage years with her favorite performer being Japanese-German AV idol Saori Hara. Okita was an art student in England during her college years but she also started to take modelling jobs and became a gravure idol before her AV debut.

Career

AV career (2011–2016) 
Okita entered the AV industry in 2011 at the age of 24. Her first adult film titled 1,000,000 Yen Body Best of All – Anri Okita was released on 7 February 2011 at the famed AV studio, S1 No. 1 Style. For the next two years Okita remained as an exclusive performer at S1 and was featured in twenty adult films with the studio, thus becoming a major player in the AV landscape as a newcomer. With her exotic looks and voluptuous figure Okita's popularity increased rapidly from mid-2011 onward in Japan as well as other Southeast Asian markets. In late 2012, Okita began to arise as a popular Japanese adult film star in Western markets like Australia and Europe and even in the US after dozens of her scenes were uploaded to adult websites like XVideos, XNXX, and Pornhub. In 2013, Okita's popularity exploded in the United States and Canada as well as Europe; she became the third watched Asian porn star after Hitomi Tanaka and Yui Hatano. In 2011, Okita was named the Number 1 Newcomer from the Asian market by Internet Adult Film Database.

In October 2012, Okita decided to transfer from S1 to Soft On Demand under the stage name of "Akane Mizuki", but by early 2013 she decided to become a freelance actress (kikatan joyū) working with numerous other AV studios like Wanz Factory, Moodyz or Fitch. During her AV career Okita was part of several high-profile projects. One was J & L – Two Pairs Of Huge Tits Take Real Creampies (released by Moodyz in June 2015) in which she co-starred with fellow AV actress and close friend Hitomi Tanaka. She was also part of Moodyz 15th anniversary work, Crimson Dream, an extravagant live action adaptation of a hentai manga with a runtime of six hours and a cast of other highly popular Japanese adult film actresses like Ai Uehara, Kaho Kasumi, Kurea Hasumi, Yui Hatano, Hibiki Otsuki, and Shoko Akiyama.

Okita also made appearances at the AVN Adult Entertainment Expo in 2015 and 2016, as well as the 33rd AVN Awards. In 2016 Okita announced her retirement from the adult industry and her last adult film Porn Retirement x Crimson – Anri Okita Captured by an Erotic Artist, directed by Kitorune Kawaguchi was released on 8 May 2016. Over her career Okita has been featured in nearly 300 films (including original works and numerous compilations).

Mainstream-career (2017–present) 

After retiring from adult films Okita remained highly popular in Japan, especially on social media and among the youth. In 2011, while still in the adult industry, Okita appeared in seven episodes of the popular Japanese tokusatsu television series Garo: Makai Senki. In 2016, Okita joined the popular pop rock group Ebisu Muscats, touring with the group in November and December 2016. In mid-2017, Okita left the group to pursue a solo career, releasing her first solo album Gorilla in October 2017. She also starred in several mainstream movies including the comedy Naked Ambition 2 and the action-thriller Diamond Dogs.

In late 2019, Okita started a YouTube channel where she uploads videos of her sketching and drawing. It is presented in a mix of English and Japanese. As of February 1, 2020, it had 23,000 subscribers and over 800,000 total channel views.

In 2021, Okita applied to gradually remove the works from the official websites of various AV companies. On August 28, 2021, she tweeted that all her works had been taken off the shelves.

Personal life 
In 2015, Okita said on the television show MarsTalk: "I want to get a dedicated Chinese boyfriend."

In December 2017, Okita married a Japanese businessman. In early 2018, the couple announced they would be having a baby-girl. On April 30, 2018, she announced that she had successfully delivered a healthy girl.

Okita is long-time-friends with fellow AV-idol superstar Hitomi Tanaka.

Filmography

Discography

Albums

Singles and EPs

See also 

 List of Japanese singers
 List of former Ebusu Muscats members
 List of pornographic performers by decade
 List of people from Birmingham

References

External links 

English emigrants to Japan
Japanese pornographic film actresses
Japanese women singers
People from Birmingham, West Midlands
Living people
Year of birth missing (living people)